The Administrative Council was a council established by the Supreme Court to govern Norway. The council of seven people was established on 15 April 1940, replacing Quisling's First Cabinet, and was led by Ingolf Elster Christensen. It was replaced on 25 September by another council by Josef Terboven, referred to in Norwegian as Josef Terboven's kommissariske statsråder.

See also
 Reichskommissariat Norwegen

References

Cabinet of Norway
1940 establishments in Norway
Norway in World War II
1940 disestablishments in Norway
Cabinets established in 1940
Cabinets disestablished in 1940